Worf is a fictional character from the Star Trek franchise.

Worf or WORF may also refer to:
 Glenn Worf (born 1954), American musician
 Window Observational Research Facility, on the International Space Station

See also
 Warf (disambiguation)
 Wharf (disambiguation)
 Whorf, a surname
 WRF (disambiguation)